The fifteenth season of Criminal Minds was ordered on January 10, 2019, with an order of 10 episodes. The season premiered on January 8, 2020, and concluded on February 19, 2020.

Cast
The entire main cast from the previous season returned.

Main cast 

 Joe Mantegna as Supervisory Special Agent David Rossi (BAU Senior Agent)
 Matthew Gray Gubler as Supervisory Special Agent Dr. Spencer Reid (BAU Agent)
 A. J. Cook as Supervisory Special Agent Jennifer "JJ" Jareau (BAU Agent)
 Kirsten Vangsness as Special Agent Penelope Garcia (BAU Technical Analyst & Co-Communications Liaison)
 Aisha Tyler as Supervisory Special Agent Dr. Tara Lewis (BAU Agent)
 Daniel Henney as Supervisory Special Agent Matt Simmons (BAU Agent)
 Adam Rodriguez as Supervisory Special Agent Luke Alvez (BAU Agent)
 Paget Brewster as Supervisory Special Agent Emily Prentiss (BAU Unit Chief & Co-Communications Liaison)

Guest stars 
 Jane Lynch as Diana Reid
 Aubrey Plaza as Cat Adams
 Ben Savage as Young Jason Gideon
 Beth Riesgraf as Dr. Maeve Donovan
 Jayne Atkinson as Erin Strauss
 C. Thomas Howell as George Foyet

Recurring cast
 Josh Stewart as William LaMontagne Jr.
 Mekhai Andersen as Henry LaMontagne
 Kelly Frye as Kristy Simmons
 Declan Whaley as David Simmons
 Stephen Bishop as Andrew Mendoza
 Michael Mosley as Everett Lynch
 Sharon Lawrence as Roberta Lynch
 Alex Jennings as Grace Lynch
 Rachael Leigh Cook as Maxine Brenner
 Gail O'Grady as Krystall Rossi
 Joseph C. Phillips as Deputy Director James Barbour

Production

Development
Criminal Minds was renewed for a fifteenth and final season with an episode order of 10 episodes on January 10, 2019. It was revealed that the final season had been held for mid-season and would premiere on January 8, 2020, in its original time slot with a two-hour season premiere and the season would wrap up with a two-hour series finale. 

Production on the final season began in the spring of 2019 as Erica Messer, the showrunner, wanted production on season fourteen and fifteen to be continuous with no break in between. 
 
On April 26, 2019, it was revealed that Kirsten Vangsness and showrunner Erica Messer would be co-writing the series finale, with long-time director and executive producer, Glenn Kershaw directing. This was the fifth episode they co-wrote together. It was also revealed that the episode would be titled "And in the End". The title comes from The Beatles song "The End" ("And in the end… the love you take is equal to the love you make…"). Messer and Vangsness chose that as the title because "those were the final lyrics ever recorded by the Beatles, a group the characters always loved."   

Former showrunner, Edward Allen Bernero, directed the fourth episode of the season "Saturday".

Casting

On February 4, 2019, it was announced that Jane Lynch would reprise her role as Diana Reid, the mother of Spencer Reid. Later that month, it was announced that Rachael Leigh Cook had been cast in a recurring role as Max, who is a love interest for Reid. Max is described as "a quirky, kind-hearted, candid woman who strikes up an unusual relationship" with Reid.

Aubrey Plaza reprises her role as Cat Adams in the sixth episode "Date Night". 

It was revealed that Jayne Atkinson, C. Thomas Howell and Beth Riesgraf would reprise their roles as Erin Strauss, George Foyet and Maeve Donovan in the series finale. Ben Savage would also reprise his role as young Jason Gideon. 

Thomas Gibson, who played Aaron Hotchner, would not be returning for the final season.

Messer revealed that Shemar Moore, who played Derek Morgan, would also not be returning for the final season.

Episodes

Ratings

References

External links

 

Criminal Minds
2020 American television seasons